Lucknow Swarna Shatabdi Express  is one of the Shatabdi Express trains operated by Indian Railways that connects the capital of India,  to state capital of Uttar Pradesh, .

Overview
This train is a Swarna category Shatabdi Express train, Swarna is a Sanskrit word meaning gold. Swarna Shatabdi means that it caters better amenities to passengers and also generates better revenue for Indian Railways as compared to other Shatabdi Express trains. Not every train in Indian Railways carries Swarna tag. It is hauled by an Electric Loco Shed, Ghaziabad WAP-7 or WAP-5 Locomotive.

History
After the gauge conversion in 1993, it was extended and previous terminal, Kanpur Central was converted to its only halt and later halted at Aligarh. Later on, it was also given halt at Ghaziabad and Etawah.
Lucknow Swarna Shatabdi Express is the first train in Indian Railways to get LHB coach on trial basis.

Initiatives
Lucknow Swarna Shatabdi has been awarded the ISO certification.

Routes

Swarna Shatabdi Express
12003 – Lucknow Junction railway station to New Delhi

12004 – New Delhi to Lucknow Junction

Coaches

Speed
Its all coaches are of air conditioned LHB coach type which is capable of reaching 160 kmph but it does not touch. Sometimes people become confused because according to Indian Railways Permanent Way Manual (IRPWM) on Indian Railways website or Indian Railway Institute of Civil Engineering website, the BG (Broad Gauge) lines have been classified into six groups ‘A’ to ‘E’ on the basis of the future maximum permissible speeds but it may not be same as present speed.

The maximum permissible speed is 130 kmph except two parts - first 29 km of journey or New Delhi (NDLS) – Chipyana Buzrung (CYZ) part where Railway is trying to raise maximum permissible sectional speed to 130 kmph from 110 kmph  and after leaving route towards Howrah, last 72 km of journey or Kanpur (CNB) – Lucknow NE Jn (LJN) route has sectional speed of 110 kmph but speed of about first 2 Kms, under North Central Railway of this route is unknown - it is as per System Map of Northern Railway (as on 31.03.2021) 

Railway board has approved the speed policy which envisages operation of passenger trains at 160 kmph on Delhi – Howrah (incl CNB-LKO that is Kanpur - Lucknow NR) route and this train leaves route towards Howrah from Kanpur and then passes through Kanpur (CNB) – Lucknow NE Jn (LJN) route which is about same as Kanpur (CNB) – Lucknow NR (LKO) route but it is still unclear what will its impact on this train in future like increasing of speed but not up to 160 kmph or up to 160 kmph

See also
Lucknow Charbagh railway station (LKO)
Kanpur Shatabdi
Aligarh Junction railway station

References

External links
https://web.archive.org/web/20130723014914/http://www.indianrail.gov.in/shatabdi_trn_list.html
Lucknow Shatabdi Timetable in Hindi

Passenger trains originating from Lucknow
Rail transport in Delhi
Railway services introduced in 2014
Shatabdi Express trains
Transport in Delhi